KWH Group Ltd (in Swedish KWH-koncernen Ab, in Finnish KWH-yhtymä Oy) is a Finnish family-owned company based in Ostrobothnia that manufactures and markets abrasives and plastic products (water traps) and provides forwarding and  logistics services, including cold storage of food. The company was formed in 1984 when Oy Keppo Ab, founded by Emil Höglund, bought the shares of Oy Wiik & Höglund Ab, founded by Höglund and Edvin Wiik.

KWH Group is the 120th largest Finnish company and the 14th largest family-owned company. It is headquartered in Vaasa, Finland.

History

Wiik & Höglund (1929–1983)

1929–1939 
Emil Höglund and Edvin Wiik were both in the timber business. In August 1929, Höglund, a clerk at the Hellnäs sawmill, which was expected to foreclose, and Wiik, who supplied the sawmill with timber, decided to establish a joint timber business, Wiik & Höglund. The aim was to trade in round timber, pit props, and pulpwood. Wiik would act as a buyer, Höglund would be responsible for sales and bookkeeping.

The first financial year was a good one, but the Great Depression of the 1930s made trading difficult in the following years.

In the summer of 1933, a huge forest fire raged in Peräseinäjoki, destroying over a thousand hectares of forest. Edvin Wiik made an offer for the right to cut the forest down, and the deal enabled the company's expansion to take off. In the second half of the 1930s, Wiik & Höglund's buyers travelled all over Finland, from Rovaniemi to Vyborg. In addition to Vaasa, there were permanent branches in Rovaniemi, Kokkola, Laihia, Kristinestad and Pori. By 1939, Wiik & Höglund had become the largest timber exporter in the country. It accounted for 26 percent of the country's total lumber exports and some 20 percent of pulpwood exports.

The company bought the Petsmo sawmill in Korsholm in 1936. The following year they become a major shareholder in the Jakobstads Cellulosa Ab pulp company led by Oy Wilh. Schauman Ab. They also established a timber procurement company Pohjanmaa Puu Oy.

In 1939, Wiik & Höglund became a shareholder in Ab Vasa Rederi, that worked in the stevedoring and forwarding sectors.

1940–1959 
During the war years, Wiik & Höglund exports were virtually halted, and other products were produced to compensate for the loss of exports. Firewood and woodchips now became the most important products, and were mainly purchased by the German and Finnish armies, as well as Finnish State authorities.

After the war, exports of round timber started up again. The company's previous customers in West Germany, France and the Netherlands became in few years time again the biggest trading partners. Profitability was good and profits were re-invested into fixed assets, mainly forest.

In 1949, the company bought Skinnarvik Manor and Lennäs Farm on the island of Kimito, acquiring with them 1 300 hectares of good forest. By 1950, the company owned five sawmills of its own. In the early 1950s, 2 200 hectares of forest were purchased from Kestilä and Siikajoki. In total, 7 400 hectares of forest were purchased.

In the autumn of 1951, Wiik & Höglund expanded into the plastics industry. the plastics company Holmsund AB in Umeå, Sweden, one of Wiik & Höglund's customers, offered them the sole manufacturing rights in Finland. Plastics production started in the basement of a residential building in Vaasa, until in 1952 a lease was acquired from Suomen Forsiitti-Dynamiitti Osakeyhtiö for the area where the Vaasa factories of the associated company Uponor Infra Oy are still located in the 2000s.

In 1953, the company founded by Wiik & Höglund became a limited company. It had its own forestry offices in Sotkamo, Oulu, Kristinestad, Pori and Forssa to support the head office. The company was run by two managing directors, Wiik and Höglund. Emil Höglund was the chairman of the board for Oy Wiik & Höglund Ab. A company, Oy Wiik & Höglund Chemicals Ab, was also set up to produce plastics.

Wiik & Höglund made major investments and acquisitions to expand their plastics business. In 1954, the Lars Berts company from Vaasa was purchased, and in 1955 the first plastic pipes were produced. Wiik & Höglund was also the first company in Finland to make expanded polystyrene sheets, which were marketed under the brand name Styrox, a name that is synonymous today in Finland with all products made of this raw material.

Plastic-coated cables were produced until 1958.

1960–1983 
The company's holding in Jakobstads Cellulosa Ab had increased, and in the 1960s Wiik & Höglund and Keppo jointly held 15 percent of Oy Wilh. Schauman Ab, making them the biggest private shareholder.

In the 1960s, Wiik & Höglund withdrew from the timber industry and its shipping business to focus on the plastics industry, which it strengthened by acquiring its Jakobstad-based competitor Oy Nars Ab. Nars and Forss & Govenius from Jakobstad were added to KWH Plast. In 1969, Wiik & Höglund and Oy Finlayson Ab jointly purchased a rival polyethylene pipe company Muovitehdas Oy in Ulvila, becoming a Wiik & Höglund subsidiary in 1986 during a restructuring of the pipe business.

In the 1970s, Wiik & Höglund embarked on several large international projects, later to be formed into the KWH Pipe International division. Pipe projects in Brazil, Iraq, South Korea and Thailand increased the company's familiarity with these markets. Restructuring and concentration on certain products continued in the 1980s, while the company continued to expand abroad. Factories making polyethylene pipes were set up in Denmark, Thailand, Canada, and in 1990 in Malaysia and Portugal. Industrial piping was added to the production programme when Oy Muotekno Ab, Oy Sul-Mu Ab, Laurolon Oy, Plastilon Oy and the French company Sipap Pipe Systems S.A. joined the Group. As a result of restructuring in the Group, the complete pipe manufacturing was transferred to KWH Pipe, which today is a part of Uponor Infra Ltd, a joint venture between Uponor's and KWH Group's infrastructure businesses.

Oy Keppo Ab (1954–1983)

The history of Keppo Mansion (1740–1954)

The site of the Keppo mansion has been characterized by small-scale industrial activities for several centuries. With the Keppo rapids providing access to water power, and in combination with the close proximity to the shipping port in Nykarleby, alderman Samuel Lithovius recognized a business opportunity for processing timber from the surrounding forests, and setup up a water-powered sawmill at the site in about 1740. Subsequent owners developed the site further with a tobacco plantation, spinning mill, pitch works and a linen-, cotton- and textile-mill until 1829 when Keppo was acquired by Carl Otto von Essen.

During the time of Otto von Essen, the sawmill experienced a boom in business. Peter Malm from Jakobstad, a well-known shipowner and industrialist, became a corporate member at the sawmill in 1840. He financed the sawmill and sold the finished products, while von Essen worked as saw inspector and timber purchaser. In the 1860s, the annual production exceeded ten thousand logs. A fire in 1893 destroyed the sawmill, and no saw mill has been operational at the Keppo rapids since. The von Essen family owned the Keppo mansion until 1899 when Hugo Grönlund acquired it, who then sold it to the Wilhelm Schauman Ab company in Jakobstad in 1906.

Viktor Schauman, the son of Wilhelm Schauman, bought the Keppo Mansion in 1918, and after a renovation, lived at the mansion with his wife until 1930, when the mansion was again sold. The main building then became an evangelical High School, and was owned by the guarantee association during 1930–1942. After a period as army accommodation during World War II, the house was again bought and restored by the Viktor Schauman family, who lived at the mansion until 1954.

The roots of Oy Keppo Ab (1937–1953)
In 1937 Emil Höglund started a fur farming hobby. Inspired by a former colleague, Karl Johan Stuns Höglund became the financier and largest owner of the mink farm established at the Petsmo sawmill. 17 minks were imported from Sweden. In 1943, Karl Johan Tidström became the second owner of the farm and by 1953 it had become the largest in Finland. The systematic breeding programmes had resulted in a unique mutation, the Finlandia Topaz, which gained worldwide recognition.

Oy Keppo Ab (1954–1983) 

In 1954, Höglund and Tidström signed a deed of sale of Keppo Mansion in Jeppo and founded Oy Keppo Ab. The largest mink farm in the world was built on the estate's land. In 1962 Keppo bought the area of the Kimo Ironworks in Oravais, where a large farm was built. In 1964, more than 100 000 mink skins were produced and the Vasa Mink Ltd large-scale farm was also established in Ireland. In 1966 the land of Oravaisten Verkatehdas Oy clothing factory was bought as well as a refrigerated ship for the transport of mink feed.

In 1963, Keppo Oy acquired the abrasives company Mirka, which had moved from Helsinki to Jeppo.

Peak production was reached in the 1970s, when approximately 130,000 skins were produced at the Keppo farm, while the production of all of the Keppo owned farms together were approximately 480,000 mink- and 150,000 fox-skins.

When Emil Höglund died in 1973, Keppo produced 10 percent of the mink skins in Finland and 2 percent in the world.

KWH Group (1984–Present)

The KWH group was formed in 1984 when Oy Keppo Ab acquired the shares of Oy Wiik & Höglund Ab from the Wiik family.

The conglomerate was restructured in the late 1980s and early 1990s, and several divestitures were made, most notable the selling of approximately 13,000 hectares of forest and the share holdings in Oy Wilh. Schauman Ab, as well as the gradual selling of all activities related to the mink and fox farming business.

In 1984 KWH Group becomes a co-owner of a water trap manufacturer Prevex that later in 2003 became a fully owned subsidiary.

In 2003, the conglomerate, which offered a wide range of products such as piping, abrasive papers and foil products, as well as logistics services, had a turnover of just over 400 million euros.

According to the new strategy, the Group's resources were to be focused on developing its core operations, which were defined as KWH Pipe, KWH Plast and KWH Mirka. All other aspects of the operations were gathered together within KWH Invest. In the beginning, KWH Pipe received the lion's share of new investments. A new production facility was opened in 1990 in Portugal, output in Canada was doubled and new and expanded production facilities were opened in Malaysia and Thailand, while operations in India began in 1992 in the form of a joint venture. Additional investments were made in Sweden, Poland and Germany. However, due to changing market conditions, the operations in China, Germany, the US and India have since closed.

In September 2012, Uponor Oyj and KWH Group Oy announced their intention to merge their infrastructure businesses. For this purpose, a joint venture, Uponor Infra Oy, was established, of which Uponor owned 55.3 percent and KWH Group 44.7 percent. In spring 2013, the Finnish Competition Authority blocked the merger plans between KWH Pipe and Uponor, but the Market Court approved the creation of the joint venture in May. Uponor Infra Oy started operations in July 2013.

A second area of investment was KWH Mirka (Mirka since 2016), working in manufacturing and marketing of abrasives, polishing compounds, and sanding machines for e.g. manufacture of composite parts, automotive refinishing (ART) and production, metal processing, and furniture production. In volume terms, Mirka is one of the five biggest operators globally in the coated abrasives sector.

In 2015, the KWH Group had a turnover of 364 million euros. It was the sixth consecutive year in which the group improved its result.

In 2016, Prevex expanded into Poland, where it acquired the family-owned Winkiel Sp.z.o.o., which was later renamed Prevex Poland. Mirka acquired the Italian companies CAFRO S.p.A. in 2017 and URMA Rolls s.r.l. in 2021.

Organization
The KWH Group consists of four independent divisions
Mirka, a manufacturer of abrasive products
KWH Logistics, which includes Backman-Trummer Group and its subsidiaries
Oy Adolf Lahti Yxpila Ab,
Oy Backman-Trummer Ab,
Oy Blomberg Stevedoring Ab,
Oy Moonway Ab,
Oy M. Rauanheimo Ab,
Stevena Oy,
Oy Otto Rodén Ab,
Blomberg Rent and
A. Jalander Oy.
Oy KWH Freeze Ab, a provider of frozen food storage services
KWH Invest, which manages strategic shareholdings and industrial real estate and includes
Oy Prevex Ab, a manufacturer of water locks.

Recognitions

 In 2016, KWH Group was chosen Family Business of the Year by the Finnish Federation of Family Businesses

References

Manufacturing companies established in 1929
Logistics companies of Finland
Manufacturing companies of Finland
Finnish brands
Companies based in Vaasa
Conglomerate companies established in 1929
1929 establishments in Finland
Tool manufacturing companies of Finland